This is a list of international prime ministerial trips made by Scott Morrison, the 30th Prime Minister of Australia. During his time in office (August 2018 to May 2022), Scott Morrison made twenty-nine international trips to eighteen sovereign countries.
The number of visits per country are as follows:
 One visit to:
Argentina, East Timor, Iraq, Italy, Papua New Guinea, the Solomon Islands, Thailand, Tuvalu, Vanuatu, and Vietnam.
 Two visits to:
Fiji, France, Indonesia, Japan, and the United States.
 Three visits to:
New Zealand, Singapore, and the United Kingdom.

2018

2019

2020
Morrison was scheduled to visit India and Japan in January 2020, but postponed these trips due to the Black Summer bushfires, and later due to the COVID-19 pandemic in Australia. The India-Australia summit was eventually held virtually in June 2020. Morrison was also due to visit Papua New Guinea in November 2020, but deferred this trip due to Prime Minister James Marape's sudden decline in parliamentary support.

2021

2022
Morrison did not make any prime ministerial overseas visits in the period between attending COP26 in Glasgow and his loss of the 2022 Australian federal election.

Multilateral meetings
Scott Morrison is scheduled to attend the following summits during his prime ministership:

Maps

Americas

Asia

Europe

Oceania

See also
 List of international prime ministerial trips made by Anthony Albanese
 Foreign relations of Australia
 Morrison Government

References

2018 in international relations
2019 in international relations
2020 in international relations
2021 in international relations
Morrison
Foreign relations of Australia
Morrison
21st century in international relations
Diplomatic visits by heads of government
Scott Morrison